Miss Suomi (Finnish for Miss Finland) is a national beauty pageant in Finland. The pageant was founded in 1931, where the winners were sent to Miss Universe.

History
Miss Suomi was held for the first time in 1931. Between 1952 and 1955 the winner of Suomen Neito went to Miss Universe, where Armi Kuusela was also crowned as the first Miss Universe in Long Beach by actress Piper Laurie in 1952. 

In 1956 due to lack of sponsorship, the national pageant of Suomen Neito was not held and made Finland withdraw from the competition. In 1960 Finland returned to Miss Universe with the second runner-up of Miss Suomi 1960, Maija-Leena Manninen, representing the country. 

In 1961 the format was changed by Miss Suomi Organization to send its winner to Miss Universe competition, and reformatted in 1962 to 1963 the first princess of Miss Suomi went to Miss Universe.

In some years, an appointed candidate has represented her country in Miss World or Miss International.

From 1964 the winner of Miss Suomi has represented her country in the Miss Universe competition.

Franchise holders
The Miss Suomi Organization owns the rights to produce three titleholders to the grand slam beauty pageants; Miss Universe, Miss World and Miss International. The winner automatically becomes Miss Universe Finland while runners-up are crowned as Miss World Finland and Miss International Finland. Before 2007 Miss Suomi Organization also sent a delegate to Miss Europe.

Hosts
Hugo Ahlberg - 1967
Tauno Äijälä - 1968
Teppo Ivaska - 1970
Yvonne de Bruyn - 1973
Helena Korhonen - 1980
Sirpa Viljamaa - 1984
Pirkko Mannola - 1986
Lola Odusoga and Michaela Söderholm - 2019

International winners
Miss Universe
1975 — Anne Pohtamo
1952 — Armi Kuusela
Miss World
1957 — Marita Lindahl
Miss International
1973 — Anneli Björkling

Titleholders

 Winning International Title 
 Miss Universe Finland
 Miss World Finland
 Miss International Finland 
 Miss Europe Finland

Titleholders under Miss Suomi org.

Miss Universe Finland

Miss Suomi started sending the winner of Miss Finland to Miss Universe in 1964. In the past, if the winner did not qualify (due to her age) for the contest, a runner-up was sent.

Miss International Finland

The 2nd Runner-up of Miss Suomi went to Miss International until 2017. In 2018 and 2019 the 1st Runner-up went to Miss International competition.

Miss World Finland

The 1st Runner-up of Miss Suomi went to Miss World until 2017. In 2018 the 2nd Runner-up went to Miss World, and in 2019 Dana Mononen was appointed as Miss World Finland 2019 by Miss Suomi Organization.

References

External links
Official Miss Suomi website 

Beauty pageants in Finland
Finnish awards
Finland